{{Infobox weapon
| is_ranged          = yes
| name               = Sharps rifle
| image              = Berdan Sharps rifle.jpg
| image_size         = 300
| caption            = 
| origin             = 
| type               = Falling-block rifle
| designer           = Christian Sharps
| design_date        = 1848
| service            = 1850–1881
| used_by            = British EmpireUnited StatesConfederate StatesQingArgentinaPeruBolivia
| wars               = Sepoy RebellionBleeding KansasAmerican Civil WarIndian WarsFenian RaidsWar of the Triple Alliance (Limited)Boshin WarTaiping RebellionArgentine Civil WarsWar of the PacificFirst Sino-Japanese WarMexican Revolution<ref>

Sharps rifles are a series of large-bore, single-shot, falling-block, breech-loading rifles, beginning with a design by Christian Sharps in 1848 and ceasing production in 1881. They were renowned for long-range accuracy. By 1874 the rifle was available in a variety of calibers, and it was one of the few designs to be successfully adapted to metallic cartridge use. The Sharps rifles became icons of the American Old West with their appearances in many Western-genre films and books. Perhaps as a result, several rifle companies offer reproductions of the Sharps rifle.

History
Sharps' initial rifle was patented September 12, 1848, and manufactured by A. S. Nippes at Mill Creek in Philadelphia, Pennsylvania, in 1850.

The second model used the Maynard tape primer, and surviving examples are marked Edward Maynard - Patentee 1845. In 1851, the second model was brought to the Robbins & Lawrence Company (R&L) of Windsor, Vermont, where the Model 1851 was developed for mass production. Rollin White of R&L invented the knife-edge breech block and self-cocking device for the "box-lock" Model 1851. This is referred to as the "first contract", which was for 10,000 Model 1851 carbines, of which approximately 1,650 were produced by R&L in Windsor.

In 1851, the "second contract" was made, for 15,000 rifles, and the Sharps Rifle Manufacturing Company was organized as a holding company with $1,000 in capital and with John C. Palmer as president, Christian Sharps as engineer, and Richard S. Lawrence as master armorer and superintendent of manufacturing. Sharps was to be paid a royalty of $1 per firearm, and the factory was built on R&L's property in Hartford, Connecticut.

The Model 1851 was replaced in production by the Model 1853.  Christian Sharps left the company in 1855 to form his own manufacturing company called "C. Sharps & Company" in Philadelphia; Lawrence continued as the chief armorer until 1872 and developed the various Sharps models and their improvements that made the rifle famous. In 1874, the company was reorganized and renamed the "Sharps Rifle Company," and it remained in Hartford until 1876, whereupon it relocated to Bridgeport, Connecticut.

The Sharps rifle played a prominent role in the Bleeding Kansas conflict during the 1850s, particularly in the hands of anti-slavery forces. The Sharps rifles supplied to anti-slavery factions earned the name "Beecher's Bibles", after the famed abolitionist Henry Ward Beecher.

The 1874-pattern Sharps was a particularly popular rifle that led to the introduction of several derivatives in quick succession. It handled a large number of .40- to .50-caliber cartridges in a variety of loadings and barrel lengths. Hugo Borchardt designed the Sharps-Borchardt Model 1878, the last rifle made by the Sharps Rifle Co. before its closing in 1881.

Reproductions of the paper cartridge Sharps M1859 and M1863 rifle and carbine, the metallic-cartridge 1874 Sharps rifle, and Sharps-Borchardt Model 1878 have been manufactured for use in Civil War re-enacting, hunting and target shooting.

Military use

Rifle 
The military Sharps rifle was produced by the Sharps Rifle Manufacturing Company and is a falling-block rifle used during and after the American Civil War in multiple variations. Along with being able to use a standard percussion cap, the Sharps has an unusual pellet primer feed. This is a device which holds a stack of pelleted primers and flips one over the nipple each time the trigger is pulled and the hammer falls—making it much easier to fire a Sharps from horseback than a gun employing individually loaded percussion caps.

It was used in the Civil War by multiple Union units, most famously by the U.S. Army marksmen known popularly as "Berdan's Sharpshooters" in honor of their leader, Hiram Berdan. The Sharps rifle made a superior sniper weapon of greater accuracy than the more commonly issued muzzle-loading rifled muskets. This was attributed to the higher rate of fire of the breech loading mechanism and superior quality of manufacture, as well as the ease with which it could be reloaded from a kneeling or prone position.

At this time however, many officers were distrustful of breech-loading weapons on the grounds that they would encourage men to waste ammunition. In addition, the Sharps rifle was expensive to manufacture (three times the cost of a muzzle-loading Springfield rifle) and so only 11,000 of the Model 1859s were produced. Most were unissued or given to sharpshooters, but the 13th Pennsylvania Reserves (which still carried the old-fashioned designation of a "rifle regiment") carried them until being mustered out in 1864.

Carbine

The carbine version was very popular with the cavalry of both the Union and Confederate armies and was issued in much larger numbers than other carbines of the war and was top in production in front of the Spencer or Burnside carbine. The falling-block action lent itself to conversion to the new metallic cartridges developed in the late 1860s, and many of these converted carbines in .50-70 Government were used during the Indian Wars in the decades immediately following the Civil War.

Some Civil War–issue carbines have an unusual feature: a hand-cranked grinder in the stock. Although long thought to be a coffee mill, experimentation with some of the few survivors suggests the grinder is ill-suited for coffee. The modern consensus is that its true purpose was for grinding corn or wheat or, more appropriately, for grinding charcoal needed in the production of black powder.

Unlike the Sharps rifle, the carbine was very popular, and almost 90,000 were produced. By 1863, it was the most common weapon carried by Union cavalry regiments, although in 1864 many were replaced by seven-shot Spencer carbines. Some Sharps clones were produced by the Confederates in Richmond. Quality was generally poorer, and they normally used brass fittings instead of iron.

The British purchased 1,000 Model 1852 carbines in 1855 which were later used in the Indian Rebellion of 1857.

Sporting rifles
Sharps made sporting versions from the late 1840s until the late 1880s. After the American Civil War, converted army surplus rifles were made into custom firearms, and the Sharps factory produced Models 1869 and 1874 in large numbers for commercial buffalo hunters and frontiersmen. These large-bore rifles were manufactured with some of the most powerful black powder cartridges ever made. Sharps also fabricated special long-range target versions for the popular Creedmoor style of  target shooting. Many modern black powder cartridge silhouette shooters use original and replica Sharps rifles to target metallic silhouettes cut in the shapes of animals at ranges up to 500 meters. Shiloh Rifle Manufacturing Company and C Sharps Arms of Big Timber, Montana, have been manufacturing reproductions of the Sharps rifle since 1983 and 1979, respectively.

Cultural significance
In the 1990 Western film Quigley Down Under, Tom Selleck's title character uses a Sharps rifle chambered in the .45-110 caliber. Theater Crafts Industry went so far as to say, "In Quigley Down Under, which we did in 1990, the Sharps rifle practically co-stars with Tom Selleck." This statement was echoed by gunwriters including John Taffin in Guns and Lionel Atwill in Field & Stream, crediting the film with an impact to rival that of Dirty Harry on the Smith & Wesson Model 29. Burt Lancaster's character Valdez in the movie Valdez Is Coming (1971) uses a Sharps rifle with deadly results at almost 1,000 yards. Also, in the western Billy Two Hats (1974), David Huddleston's character Copeland wounds Gregory Peck's character, Archie Deans, at a far distance.

Firearms manufacturers such as Davide Pedersoli and Shiloh Rifle Manufacturing Company have credited these movies with an increase in demand for those rifles. As a result of the popularity of the film, a Sharps match is held annually in Forsyth, Montana, known as the "Matthew Quigley Buffalo Rifle Match".

See also
.50-90 Sharps
Billy Dixon, Medal of Honor recipient at the Second Battle of Adobe Walls
Rifles in the American Civil War

Notes

References
 Coates, Earl J., and Thomas S. Dean. An Introduction to Civil War Small Arms. Gettysburg, Penn.: Thomas Publications, 1990. .
 Marcot, Roy - Marron, Edward - Paxton, Ron. "Sharps Firearms: The Percussion Era 1848 - 1865", April 2019
 Sellers, Frank M. Sharps Firearms. North Hollywood, Calif: Beinfeld Pub, 1978. .
 Smith, Winston O. The Sharps Rifle, Its History, Development and Operation. New York: William Morrow and Company, 1943.

External links
Sharps Model 1874 - Background history
Sharps Model 1874 - Shooting and reloading
 The Sharps Rifle, RifleShooter magazine
http://shilohrifle.com/

American Civil War rifles
Early rifles
Rifles of the United States
Guns of the American West
Falling-block rifles
Indian Rebellion of 1857
Hunting rifles